General elections were held in British India in 1934. The Indian National Congress emerged as the largest party in the Central Legislative Assembly.

The total electorate for the 1934 elections was 1,415,892, of which 1,135,899 were in contested constituencies. The total number of votes polled was 608,198. The election marked the first year in which Indian women were eligible to vote in any but a local election. Of the 81,602 enrolled women voters, 62,757 of whom were in contested constituencies, only 14,505 actually used the ballot.

Results
Out of the 51 general seats of the general constituencies, the Congress won 37 seats. The party also won 5 seats in the non-General constituencies. A Congress splinter group, the Congress Nationalist Party, was the only other one to gain a significant number of seats. Most of the 30 Muslim constituencies elected independents to the Council, but within the Council, leadership of the independent Muslims was assumed by Muhammad Ali Jinnah, who, shortly after the election, resumed the leadership of the moribund Muslim League from which he had previously retired. Of the 32 seats filled without a contest, twelve were in Muslim constituencies, eight in European constituencies, eight in general constituencies, three reserved for landholders and one reserved for commerce.

Membership by province

The party position in 1941 stood as follows:
Central Legislative Assembly

Council of State

Members of Central Legislative Assembly

Nominated members
Government of India: Sir Frank Noyce, Sir Nripendra Nath Sircar, Sir James Grigg, Sir Henry Craik, Muhammad Zafrulla Khan, P. R. Rau, Girija Shankar Bajpai, Sir Aubrey Metcalfe, G. R. F. Tottenham, A. G. Clow, A. H. Lloyd, A. S. Hands, G. H. Spence, H. Dow
Officials from Provinces: A. A. Venkatarama Ayyar (Madras), R. V. Krishna Ayyar (Madras), S. A. V. Acott (Bombay), Saiyid Aminuddin (Bombay), A. J. Dash (Bengal), Srimanta Kumar Das Gupta (Bengal), Shaikh Khurshaid Muhammad (Punjab), N. J. Roughton (Central Provinces), W. V. Grigson (Central Provinces), J. H. Hutton (Assam), L. Owen (United Provinces), J. F. Sale (United Provinces), Shyam Narayan Singh (Bihar & Orissa), R. M. MacDougall (Burma)
Berar Representative: M. S. Aney
 Special Interests: M. C. Rajah (Depressed Classes), Henry Gidney (Anglo-Indian), Dr. F. X. DeSouza (Indian Christians), L. C. Buss (Associated Chamber of Commerce), N. M. Joshi (Labour Interests)
 Non-Officials from Provinces: Dr. R. D. Dalal (Bombay), Sir Satya Charan Mukherjee (Bengal), Sardar Jawahar Singh (Punjab), Ramaswami Srinivasa Sarma (Bihar & Orissa),

Elected Members
 Ajmer-Merwara: Seth Bhagchand Soni
Assam: Kuladhar Chaliha (Assam Valley General), Nabin Chandra Bardoloi (Assam Valley General), Basanta Kumar Das (Surma Valley cum Shillong General), Abdul Matin Chaudhury (Muslim), C. H. Witherington (European)
Bengal: N. C. Chunder (Calcutta General), P. N. Banerjea (Calcutta Suburbs General), Amarendranath Chatterjee (Burdwan General), Pandit Lakshmi Kanta Maitra (Presidency General), Suryya Kumar Som (Dacca General), Akhil Chandra Datta (Chittagong & Rajshahi General), Sir Abdur Rahim (Calcutta & Suburbs Muslim), Haji Chowdhury Muhammad Ismail Khan (Burdwan & Presidency Muslim), Sir Abdul Halim Ghuznavi (Dacca-cum-Mymensingh Muslim), Anwarul Azim (Chittagong Muslim), Khabeeruddin Ahmed (Rajshahi Muslim), T. Chapman Mortimer (European), A. Aikman (European), Dhirendra Kanta Lahiri Chaudhury (Landholders), Babu Baijnath Bajoria (Marwari Association)
Bihar & Orissa: Bhubananda Das (Orissa General), Nilakantha Das (Orissa General), Anugrah Narayan Sinha (Patna-cum-Shahabad General), Shri Krishna Sinha (Gaya-cum-Monghyr General), Bepin Bihari Verma (Muzaffarpur-cum-Champaran General), Kailash Bihari Lall (Bhagalpur, Purnea & Santhal districts General), Satya Narain Singh (Darbhanga cum Saran General), Raja Bahadur Harihar Prasad Narayan Sinha (Landholders)
Bombay: Dr. Gopalrao V. Deshmukh (Bombay City General), Sir Cowasji Jehangir (Bombay City General), Lalchand Navalrai (Sind General), Bhulabhai Desai (Bombay Northern General), Keshavrao Jedhe (Bombay Central General), Narhar Vishnu Gadgil (Bombay Central General), Muhammad Ali Jinnah (Bombay City Muslim), Abdullah Haroon (Sind Muslim), Hooseinbhoy A. Lalljee (Bombay Central Muslim), Homi Mody (Bombay Millowners' Association), Mathuradas Vissanji (Indian Merchants' Chamber & Bureau), Sir Ghulam Hidayatullah (Sind Jagirdars & Landholders), W. B. Hossack (European), Sir Leslie Hudson (European)
Burma: Dr. Thein Maung (General), U Ba Si (General), F. B. Leach (European)
Central Provinces: Narayan Bhaskar Khare (Nagpur), Seth Govind Das (Hindi Divisions), Ghanshyam Singh Gupta (Hindi Divisions), Khan Saheb Nawab Siddique Ali Khan (Muslim), Seth Sheodass Daga (Landholders)
Delhi: Asaf Ali
Madras: S. Satyamurti (Madras City General), M. A. Ayyangar (Madras ceded districts & Chittoor General), V. V. Giri (Ganjam cum Vizagapatam General), Kasinathuni Nageswara Rao (Godavari cum Kistna General), N. G. Ranga (Guntur-cum-Nellore General), T. S. Avinashilingam Chettiar (Salem & Coimbatore cum North Arcot General), C. N. Muthuranga Mudaliar (South Arcot cum Chingleput General), T. S. S. Rajan (Tanjore cum Trichinopoly General), P. S. Kumaraswami Raja (Madura & Ramnad cum Tinnevelly General), Samuel Aaron (West Coast & Nilgiris General), Umar Ali Shah (North Madras Muslim), Moulvi Sayyid Murtuza Saheb Bahadur (South Madras Muslim), Haji Abdul Sathar H. Essak Seit (West Coast & Nilgiris Muslim), F. E. James (European), Raja Sir Vasudeva Rajah of Kollengode (Landholders), Sami Venkatachalam Chetty (Indian Commerce)
NWFP: Khan Abdul Jabbar Khan
Punjab: Lala Sham Lal (Ambala General), Bhai Parmanand (West Punjab General), Raizada Hans Raj (Jullundur General), Ghulam Bhik Nairang (East Punjab Muslim), K. L. Gauba (East Central Punjab Muslim), Zafar Ali Khan (East Central Punjab Muslim), H. M. Abdullah (West Central Punjab Muslim), Nawab Sahibzada Sayed Sir Muhammad Mehr Shah (North Punjab Muslim), Khan Bahadur Shaik Fazal-i-Haq Piracha (North-West Punjab Muslim), Khan Bahadur Nawab Makhdum Murid Hussain Qureshi (South West Punjab Muslim), Sardar Mangal Singh (East Punjab Sikh), Sardar Harbans Singh Brar (East Punjab Sikh), Sardar Sant Singh (West Punjab Sikh), M. Ghiasuddin (Landholders)
United Provinces: Bhagwan Das (UP Cities General), Choudhri Raghubir Narain Singh (Meerut General), Sri Krishna Dutta Paliwal (Agra General), Kunwar Raghubir Singh (Agra General), Govind Ballabh Pant (Rohilkund & Kumaon General), Sri Prakasa (Allahabad & Jhansi General), Krishna Kant Malaviya (Benaras & Gorakhpur General), Muhammad Yamin Khan (Agra Muslim), Maulvi Sir Muhammad Yakub (Rohilkund & Kumaon Muslim), Ziauddin Ahmad (UP Southern Muslim), Mohamed Azhar Ali (Lucknow & Fyzabad Muslim)

References

1934 in India
1934 elections in India
1934 elections in Asia
1934
1934
1934
1934
Central Legislative Assembly of India
Provincial Assembly elections in British India